Monteluz, Granada is a municipality in Spain.

Monteluz may also refer to:

Monteluz (pisco), a Peruvian pisco distillery